Olia Lialina (May 4, 1971, Moscow) is an Internet artist and theorist, an experimental film and video critic and curator.

Life 
Lialina graduated in 1993 after studying film criticism and journalism at Moscow State University, followed by art residencies at C3 (Budapest, 1997) and Villa Waldberta (Munich, 1998).

In 1994 she was one of the founders, and later director, of Cine Fantom, an experimental cinema club in Moscow that she co-founded together with Gleb Aleinikov, Andrej Silvestrov, Boris Ukhananov, Inna Kolosova and others.

Lialina taught at New Media Lab (Moscow, 1994), Joint Art Studios (Moscow, 1995), University of Westminster (London, 1997), MUU (Helsinki, 1997), Kunst Academiet (Trondheim, 1998); Fachhochschule (Augsburg, 1998), University of Graz (1998) and Akademie der Bildenden Künste München (Munich, 1998–99). In 1999 Lialina became a teacher and course director at the New Media pathway program at the Merz Akademie in Stuttgart. She is a pioneer in net art and one of the first to make art for networked browsers.

Work

Artworks (selection) 
Art Teleportacia is the online gallery of Lialina's work. Some of her artwork is maintained in the computerfinearts collection at the Rose Goldsen Archive of New Media Art, Cornell University.
My Boyfriend Came Back From The War is a 1996 piece of internet art. In black and white GIF images and HTML frames, Lialina creates a hypertext narrative of a couple that meet when the male comes back from a war. The female talks about cheating, and there is some mention of marriage. The whole piece is in black and white, is nonlinear, and the story progresses as one clicks on the different words and images while the frames split in further subdivisions. The user can select their own path.
 Since 1998, My Boyfriend Came Back From The War, considered a classic in internet art, was appropriated and remixed by various other new media artists in many different forms, from Flash and a 3D environment in the Castle Wolfenstein game engine to a video and PowerPoint. This remix project is entitled The Last Real Net Art Museum. It includes versions of the work by JODI, Constant Dullaart and Auriea Harvey & Michaël Samyn, among many others. The work was the first inclusion in Rhizome's Net Art Anthology in 2017.
 Agatha Appears (1997) is a story told through the title elements of hyperlinks. Man.gif meets woman.jpeg, he introduces her to the Internet, she is teleported there and is never alone again.
 From 2001 to 2003, Olia Lialina created a web comic named Zombie and Mummy with Dragan Espenschied. The comic contained the characters Zombie, a zombie, and Mummy, a mummy. Each comic was created on a Palm Pilot, and was designed to be mediocre on purpose. Comics consisted of usually 4 panels each, beginning with "Zombie and Mummy..." followed by the comic title. The story would then progress, until a simple (usually) conclusion would be reached, and "The End" would be displayed in bubble letters dripping with blood. Each comic was embedded into a webpage, some Olia's own creation, some taken from other sources. The webpages were usually styled after typical GeoCities-like websites at the time.
 The most beautiful web page (2002) is a web page which appears to be as the link states "some universe". The link to the page is in the words which appear in the middle of the page and read "SOME UNIVERSE for heike, dragan and your browser" when clicked on, a new web page appears in which one must scroll using the  page down on your keyboard. While doing this the various spots of color on the black background appear to twinkle and move. Throughout the scrolling there are different images that appear, at times there are stripes of color which look as if they are moving in the opposite direction of the rest of the site. Finally at the bottom of the page five images can be seen, including a horizontal stripe of sparkling purple lights.
Peeman.gif (2014-2017) is a gif of a small figure peeing and is usually coupled with a second image for him to urinate on.
Treasure Trove (2017) is an “expropriation of glitter and bling” it includes several gifs stacked on top of each other until the screen is filled with glittering images.
 Online Newspapers (2004) is a webpage that features various newspapers from around the world, interspersed with GIFs. There are five different newspapers from different parts of the world in order from left to right.
 Frankfurter Allgemeine Zeitung, August 2, 2004, with a GIF of roses,
 Daily Jang, August 6, 2004, with colored sphere animations,
 USA TODAY, with GIFs of American flags and of the Statue of Liberty. The date for this newspaper is August 9, 2004 and when scrolled over the part entitled "Election Officials Act to Stop Snags" the same newspaper is revealed without the GIFs, in black and white.
 The Wall Street Journal Europe, with a GIF of animals, dates from August 4, 2004.
 Dajiyuan, August 4, 2004, containing GIFs of Street Fighter.
Animated GIF Model (2005-2012) is a digital performance where Olia Lialina spreads her own image, in animated GIF format, over the World Wide Web. In 2016 this work has been acquired in the collections of the Stedelijk Museum Amsterdam and Museum of the Image (MOTI) Breda, in the form of GIF files for Tumblr, as a video installation for a museum, and as GIF files that must be spread via social media. The animated GIF file format saw a large-scale revival in the early 2010s on platforms like Tumblr and 4chan and entered the mainstream digital culture of Facebook around 2014. Like a digital anthropologist, Lialina collects and researches the most important types of images used online, and she re-interprets them in an artistic way.
Give Me Time/This Page is No More (2015-) is an installation that documents two phases in the life cycle of Geocities websites. Hundred-sixty 35mm slides are projected on a wall by two slide projects, showing screenshots of Geocities' websites that promise future development on the left, and pages announcing their shutdown on the right. The installation has been presented at a.o. The New Museum, Aksioma, ArtProjects, Bethanien, HKMV, and The Kitchen.

Writing and research 
Olia Lialina regularly writes and publishes about new media, digital folklore, amateur or vernacular web design, the early history of home pages and the early conventions of the web. Her essays, projects and publications include:

 A Vernacular Web. Indigenous and Barbarians (2005), talk at the conference A Decade of Webdesign (Amsterdam) and essay
 Vernacular Web 2 (2007)
 
 One Terabyte of Kilobyte Age (2011-), a project with Dragan Espenschied. Lialina and Espenschied downloaded the entire Geocities archive (Geocities was shut down in 2009) and regularly and automatically publish screenshots of GeoCities websites on a Tumblr blog.
 Prof. Dr. Style, Vernacular Web 3 (2010)
 In 2012, Lialina coined the term "Turing Complete User" in an essay of the same name. The piece was well received internationally and was reviewed by Bruce Sterling  and Cory Doctorow, among others.
 In 2015, the preface of Digital Folklore, co-written by Lialina and Espenschied, was included alongside an edited excerpt of Lialina's essay "Turing Complete User" in Mass Effect: Art and the Internet in the Twenty-First Century co-published by MIT Press and New Museum of Contemporary Art.

References

Further reading 
 
 Rosenthal, S., & Dinkla, S. (2002). Stories: Erzählstrukturen in der zeitgenössischen Kunst : Eija-Liisa Ahtila, Lars Arrhenius, Birgit Brenner, Susanne Berkenheger, Sophie Calle, Tracey Emin, Anna Gaskell, Renee Green, Josph Grigely, Rachel Harrison, Benjamin Heisenberg, Anton Henning, Lynn Hershman, William Kentridge, Olia Lialina, Julia Loktev, Florian Merkel, M+M Aernout Mik, Abigail O'Brien, Franck Scurti, Andreas Siekmann, Sam Taylor-Wood, Janaina Tschäpe, Susanne Weirich. Köln: DuMont. 
 
 Dekker, Annet. Twintig Jaar Op Het Web: My Boyfriend Came Back From The War, 2016-02-09, accessed on 2016-12-19.

External links 

 art.teleportacia.org, Olia Lialina's website and art portfolio
 contemporary-home-computing.org, shared website of Olia Lialina and Dragan Espenschied
 Olia Lialina, 'Summer' (2013)

Living people
1971 births
Digital artists
Women digital artists
Net.artists
Moscow State University alumni
Russian educators
Women educators
Russian film critics
Russian women critics
Russian contemporary artists
New media artists
21st-century Russian women artists
Electronic literature writers